Köhler is a German surname, referring to a man making charcoal from wood.

Geographical distribution
As of 2014, 96.2% of all known bearers of the surname Köhler were residents of Germany (frequency 1:641) and 1.5% of Austria (1:4,238).

In Germany, the frequency of the surname was higher than national average (1:641) in the following states:
 1. Thuringia (1:230)
 2. Saxony (1:252)
 3. Saxony-Anhalt (1:349)
 4. Brandenburg (1:459)
 5. Hesse (1:507)
 6. Mecklenburg-Vorpommern (1:626)
 7. Berlin (1:638)

People
Horst Köhler, real name of the singer Guildo Horn (born 1963)
Ilse Köhler, the maiden name of Ilse Koch, (1906–1967), Nazi war criminal
Alban Köhler (1874–1947), German radiologist. Born in Petsa (Thuringia), he discovered a rare foot disorder found in children which was named Köhler disease in his honour. He died in Niederselters
August Köhler (1866–1948), microscopist and inventor of the Köhler illumination
Axel Köhler (born 1959), German countertenor and opera director. In 1994, he won the Handel Prize. Since 2009, he has been Artistic Director of the Halle Opera House
Bedřich Köhler (born 1985), Czech professional ice hockey player. He played with HC Zlín in the Czech Extraliga during the 2010–11 Czech Extraliga season
Benjamin Köhler (born 1980), football player
Christian Köhler (1809–1861), German painter
Dirk Köhler (1968–1994), German sport shooter who competed in the 1988 Summer Olympics. He was born in Karlsruhe
Emmy Köhler (1858–1925), born 22 May 1858 in Stockholm, Sweden, dead 2 February 1925 in Fresta, Sweden was a Swedish hymnwriter and writer
Erich Köhler (1892–1958), German politician. President of the Bundestag, 7 September 1949–18 October 1950
Ernesto Köhler (1849–1907), flute player and composer
Eva Köhler (born 1947), First Lady of Germany 2004–2010
Franz Köhler (1901–1982), Austrian football manager and former player. He managed the Icelandic national team from 1953 to 1954
Frauke Köhler (born 1983), German State attorney 
Georg Köhler (1900–1972), German international footballer
Georges J. F. Köhler (1946–1995), biologist and 1984 Nobel laureate in Medicine
Gundolf Köhler (1959–1980), right-wing extremist
Heinrich Köhler (1878–1949), German politician who served as the fifth and eighth State President of Baden and the eleventh Minister of Finance in the Weimar Republic
Hermann Köhler (born 1950), former sprinter who specialized in the 400 metres. He represented West Germany and competed for the club TV Wattenscheid
Hilding Köhler (1888–1982), professor of Meteorology at the University of Uppsala in Uppsala, Sweden who performed groundbreaking research in cloud physics
Horst Köhler (born 1943), President of Germany (2004–2010)
Johan Harmen Rudolf Köhler (1818–1873), Dutch colonial Major General
Johann David Köhler (1684–1755), library and information scientist
Juliane Köhler (born 1965), German actress
Jörn Köhler (born 1970), German Herpetologist. His main research focus is on tropical amphibians and reptiles, mainly in South America and Africa. He works for the Hessisches Landesmuseum Darmstadt and published in a number of scientific magazines
Jürgen Köhler (born 1946), former East German slalom canoeist who competed in the 1960s and 1970s. He won three medals at the ICF Canoe Slalom World Championships with a gold (C-1 team: 1971), a silver (C-1 team: 1967) and a bronze (C-2 team: 1973)
Katarina Köhler (born 1954), Swedish politician
Koos Köhler (1905–1965), Dutch water polo player. He competed at the 1928 Summer Olympics, where the Dutch team shared fifth place. Köhler played all three matches, together with his cousin Sjaak, and scored seven goals
Kristina Schröder (née Köhler, born 1977), German politician
Louis Köhler (1820–1886), German composer
Lukas Köhler (born 1986), German politician
Manuel Köhler (born 1969), Austrian slalom canoer who competed from the mid-1980s to the early 2000s (decade). He won a bronze medal in the K-1 team event at the 1996 European Championships in Augsburg
Maria João Köhler, Portuguese tennis player
Michael Köhler (born 1944), East German luger who competed in the late 1960s and early 1970s. He won two medals in the men's doubles event at the FIL World Luge Championships with a silver in 1970 and a bronze in 1969
René Köhler, a non-existent conductor invented by William Barrington-Coupe as part of a fraud in which he passed off numerous plagiarised recordings of classical pianists as the work of his wife, Joyce Hatto
Rolf Köhler (1951–2007), German singer, musician and record producer
Siegfried Köhler (disambiguation)
Siegfried Köhler (conductor) (1923–2017), German conductor, composer and academic teacher
Siegfried Köhler (cyclist) (born 1935), German cyclist
Sven Köhler (footballer, born 1966), former German footballer who currently manages Chemnitzer FC
Sven Köhler (footballer, born 1996), German footballer
Thomas Köhler (born 1940), East German former luger who competed during the 1960s
Ulrich Köhler (1838–1903), German archaeologist
Walter Köhler (died 1989), Minister President of Baden, Germany during the Nazi regime
Wolfgang Köhler (1887–1967), psychologist

See also
 Köhler's Medicinal Plants, a German medicinal guide published by Franz Eugen Köhler in 1887
 Köhler theory, describes the process in which water vapor condenses and forms liquid cloud drops
 Köhler disease, a rare bone disorder of the foot found in children between six and nine years of age. The disease typically affects boys, but it can also affect girls. It was first described in 1908 by Alban Köhler (1874–1947), a German radiologist
 Köhler illumination, a method of specimen illumination used for transmitted and reflected light (trans- and epi-illuminated) optical microscopy
 Köhler & Son, London horn makers

References

German-language surnames